The Laureus World Sports Award for Sportswoman of the Year is an annual award honouring the achievements of individual women from the world of sports. It was first awarded in 2000 as one of the seven constituent awards presented during the Laureus World Sports Awards. The awards are presented by the Laureus Sport for Good Foundation, a global organisation involved in more than 150 charity projects supporting 500,000 young people. The first ceremony was held on 25 May 2000 in Monte Carlo, at which Nelson Mandela gave the keynote speech. , a shortlist of six nominees for the award comes from a panel composed of the "world's leading sports editors, writers and broadcasters". The Laureus World Sports Academy then selects the winner who is presented with a Laureus statuette, created by Cartier, at an annual awards ceremony held in various locations around the world. The awards are considered highly prestigious and are frequently referred to as the sporting equivalent of "Oscars".

The inaugural winner of the award was American sprinter Marion Jones, who, at the time of the presentation, was considered to be "the world's dominant sprinter". She later admitted to having taken performance-enhancing drugs and, along with being stripped of her Olympic medals by the International Olympic Committee in 2007, her Laureus Award and nominations (2001 and 2003) were rescinded.  The 2021 winner of the Laureus World Sports Award for Sportswoman of the Year was the Japanese tennis player Naomi Osaka.  Sportswomen from athletics are the most successful overall, with eight wins and thirty-one nominations (excluding Jones' rescissions). American sportswomen have won more awards and nominations than any other nationality, with ten wins and twenty-nine nominations. Serena Williams holds the record for the most awards with four. The 2022 award was won by Jamaican sprinter Elaine Thompson-Herah.

List of winners and nominees

Statistics
Statistics are correct as of 2022 nominations.

See also

 List of sports awards honoring women
 Laureus World Sports Award for Sportsman of the Year
 Athlete of the Year

References

Sportswoman of the Year
Awards established in 2000
Sports awards honoring women